Bryansville is an unincorporated community in York County, Pennsylvania, United States. The village of Bryansville has a large residential area known as Susquehanna Trails almost adjacent to it.  Until 1978, this community was served by the Maryland and Pennsylvania Railroad at milepost 45.9.

References

Unincorporated communities in York County, Pennsylvania
Unincorporated communities in Pennsylvania